The non-marine molluscs of Nicaragua are a part of the molluscan wildlife of Nicaragua. A number of species of non-marine molluscs are found in the wild in Nicaragua.

There are ?? species of gastropods (?? species of freshwater gastropods, at least 79 species of land gastropods) and ?? species of freshwater bivalves living in the wild.

A field study by Pérez & Aburto (2008) has shown that the primary forest had highest biodiversity of molluscs in comparison to other land use types.

Freshwater gastropods

Land gastropods

Pomatiidae
 Chondropoma callipeplum Solem, 1961

Cyclophoridae
 Adelopoma stolli Martens, 1890

Helicinidae
 Helicina rostrata Morelet, 1851
 Helicina tenuis (Pfeiffer, 1847)
 Lucidella lirata (Pfeiffer, 1847)

Neocyclotidae
 Neocyclotus dysoni, subspecies Neocyclotus dysoni nicaraguense Bartsch & Morrison, 1942 is endemic subspecies of Nicaragua

Strobilopsidae
 Strobilops sp. – an endemic species of the genus Strobilops

Vertiginidae
 Bothriopupa conoidea (Newcomb, 1853)
 Bothriopupa tenuidens (C. B. Adams, 1845)
 Pupisoma dioscoricola (C. B. Adams, 1845)
 Pupisoma minus Pilsbry, 1920
 Pupisoma mediomericana
 Sterkia antillensis Pilsbry, 1920
 Vertigo milium (Gould, 1840)

Pupillidae
 Gastrocopta geminidens (Pilsbry, 1917)
 Gastrocopta gularis Thompson & López, 1996
 Gastrocopta servilis (Gould, 1843)
 Gastrocopta pellucida (Pfeiffer, 1841)
 Gastrocopta pentodon (Say, 1821)

Succineidae
 Succinea guatemalensis Morelet, 1849
 Succinea recisa (Morelet, 1851)

Ferussaciidae
 Caeciliodes consobrinus (Orbigny, 1849) or Cecilioides consobrinus Orbigny, 1855
 Cecilioides gundlachi (Pfeiffer, 1850)

Subulinidae
 Beckianum beckianum (Pfeiffer, 1846)
 Beckianum sinistrum (Martens, 1898) – Near Threatened
 Beckianum sp. – endemic
 Lamellaxis gracilis (Hutton, 1834)
 Lamellaxis micra (Orbigny, 1835)
 Leptinaria guatemalensis (Crosse & Fischer, 1877)
 Leptinaria insignis (Smith, 1898)
 Leptinaria interstriata (Tate, 1870)
 Leptinaria lamellata (Potiez & Michaud, 1838)
 Leptinaria strebeliana Pilsbry, 1907
 Leptinaria tamaulipensis Pilsbry, 1903
 Leptinaria sp. – endemic
 Opeas pumillum (Pfeiffer, 1840)
 Pseudopeas sp. – endemic
 Subulina octona (Bruguière, 1792)

Streptaxidae
 Huttonella bicolor (Hutton, 1834)

Spiraxidae
 Euglandina cumingii (Beck, 1837)
 Euglandina obtusa (Pfeiffer, 1844) – endemic
 Euglandina wani (Jaconson, 1968) – synonym: Streptostyla wani Jaconson, 1968 – endemic
 Pittieria underwoodi (Fulton, 1897)
 Salasiella guatemalensis Pilsbry, 1919
 Salasiella hinkleyi Pilsbry, 1919
 Salasiella perpusilla (Pfeiffer, 1880)
 Spiraxis sp. – endemic
 Streptostyla turgidula Pfeiffer, 1856

Agriolimacidae
 Deroceras laeve (Müller, 1774)

Euconulidae
 Euconulus pittieri (Martens, 1892)
 Guppya gundlachi (Pfeiffer, 1880)
 Habroconus championi (Martens, 1892)
 Habroconus selenkai (Pfeiffer, 1866)
 Habroconus trochulinus (Morelet, 1851)

[[File:Hawaiia minuscula shell.jpg|thumb|Five shells of Hawaiia minuscula]]
Pristilomatidae
 Hawaiia minuscula (Binney, 1840)

Zonitidae
 Glyphyalinia indentata (Say, 1822)
 Glyphyalinia sp. – endemic
 Striatura meridionalis (Pilsbry & Ferriss, 1906)

Helminthoglyptidae
 Trichodiscina coactiliata (Deshayes, 1838)

Polygyridae
 Praticollela griseola (Pfeiffer, 1841)

Thysanophoridae
 Thysanophora caecoides (Tate, 1870)
 Thysanophora costaricensis Rehder, 1942
 Thysanophora crinita (Fulton, 1917)
 Thysanophora hornii (Gabb, 1866)
 Thysanophora plagioptycha (Shuttleworth, 1854)

Sagdidae
 Xenodiscula taintori (Goodrich & Schalie, 1937)

Orthalicidae
 Orthalicus ferussaci Martens, 1863
 Orthalicus princeps (Broderip, 1833)

 Bulimulus corneus (Sowerby, 1833)
 Drymaeus alternans (Beck, 1837)
 Drymaeus attenuatus (Pfeiffer, 1851)
 Drymaeus discrepans (Sowerby, 1833)
 Drymaeus dominicus Reeve, 1850
 Drymaeus multilineatus (Say, 1825)
 Drymaeus translucens (Broderip, 1832)

Systrophiidae
 Drepanostomella pinchoti Pilsbry, 1930
 Miradiscops opal (Pilsbry, 1916) – endemic
 Miradiscops panamensis Pilsbry, 1930

Punctidae
 Punctum burringtoni Pilsbry, 1930

Charopidae
 Chanomphalus pilsbryi (Baker, 1922)
 Radiodiscus millecostatus Pilsbry & Ferris, 1906
 Radiodiscus sp. – endemic

Veronicellidae
 Diplosolenodes occidentalis (Guilding, 1825)
 Leidyula floridana'' (Leidy & Binney, 1851)

Bivalvia

See also
 List of marine molluscs of Nicaragua

Regional:
 List of non-marine molluscs of Honduras
 List of non-marine molluscs of Costa Rica

General:
 Fauna of Nicaragua

References

Further reading

Molluscs
Nicaragua
Nicaragua
Nicaragua
Nicaragua